André Burkhard (born 6 November 1950) is a French former professional footballer who played as a defender. He was part of SC Bastia team that reached 1978 UEFA Cup Final. Burkhard made 69 Ligue 1 appearances over three seasons with RC Strasbourg.

References

External links
 
 

1950 births
Living people
Sportspeople from Bas-Rhin
French people of German descent
French footballers
Association football defenders
ASPV Strasbourg players
RC Strasbourg Alsace players
SC Bastia players
Le Puy Foot 43 Auvergne players
Grenoble Foot 38 players
Ligue 1 players
Ligue 2 players
Footballers from Alsace